The Wiawaka bateaux are a cluster of shipwrecks in Lake George, New York State. The seven British and colonial bateaux were scuttled in 1758 during the French and Indian Wars, with the intention of recovery in 1759. This never happened, and their wrecks were discovered between 1963 and 1964 by archaeological diver Terry Crandall, working under the auspices of the Adirondack Museum. The site was listed on the National Register of Historic Places in 1992.

References

Shipwrecks on the National Register of Historic Places in New York (state)
Archaeological sites on the National Register of Historic Places in New York (state)
Shipwrecks of New York (state)
Buildings and structures in Warren County, New York
Shipwrecks in lakes
National Register of Historic Places in Warren County, New York
1758 in the Province of New York